The shortnose sucker (Chasmistes brevirostris) is a rare species of fish in the family Catostomidae, the suckers. This fish is native to southern Oregon and northern California in the United States. It is a federally listed endangered species of the United States.

This fish can grow up to half a meter long. It has a large head and thin, fleshy lips, the lower of which is notched. It has been observed to reach 33 years of age. It becomes sexually mature between four and six years of age.

The preferable habitat for the fish is a turbid, shallow, somewhat alkaline, well-oxygenated lake that is cool, but not cold, in the summer season.

The fish usually spawns in flowing river habitat, such as riffles, with gravelly or rocky substrates. It was at one time observed to spawn at lakeshores, but it apparently does this rarely today. The eggs incubate for two weeks and the juveniles hatch between April and June. The juveniles generally stay along the shoreline in vegetated or unvegetated habitat.

Today this fish can be found in Upper Klamath Lake and its tributaries, the Lost River, Clear Lake, the Klamath River, and Gerber Reservoir of the Klamath Project.

Threats to this species include the reduction of its spawning habitat, much of which was eliminated by the construction of dams in local waterways. Upper Klamath Lake experiences periodic blooms of cyanobacteria and reduction of dissolved oxygen in the water. Land alteration along the waterways has caused loss and degradation of the habitat.

This and related fish were a major food source of local tribes, and are still considered to be sacred animals. The shortnose sucker is known as Qapdo by the local Native American Nation, the Klamath Tribes.

References 

Catostomidae
Fish of the Western United States
Freshwater fish of the United States
Fauna of California
Modoc Plateau
Modoc National Forest
Natural history of Oregon
Endemic fauna of the United States
Taxa named by Edward Drinker Cope
Fish described in 1879
Endangered fish
Endangered fauna of California
Endangered fauna of the United States
ESA endangered species